Anselmo Fernandez Rodrigues (21 August 1918 in Lisbon – 19 January 2000 in Madrid) was a Portuguese architect and football manager who led Sporting Clube de Portugal to victory in the UEFA Cup Winners' Cup in 1964.

Anselmo Fernandez, of Spanish extraction, initially hoped for a career as football player with Lisbon's Sporting Clube de Portugal, however his health did not allow for it. He later engaged with Rugby at the club and emerged as a well regarded referee in that sport.

His career focus then switched to architecture. His first major work was the original Estádio José Alvalade, which he built in conjunction with António Augusto Sá da Costa. The 61,000 capacity stadium of SCP opened in 1956. He was a major collaborator in many works of the architects Porfírio Pardal Monteiro and António Pardal Monteiro being involved with construction of the Lisbon hotel Tivoli, National Library of Portugal, the directorate of Lisbon University and the Faculty of Law. The Reitoria da Universidade, the university directorate was awarded with a Prémio Valmor, a major architectural prize.

In 1962 he had a first brief stint as coach of Sporting's football team. His second stint at the helm of Sporting ended spectacular. In the quarterfinals of the European Cup Winner' Cup in March 1964 Sporting defeated Manchester United – featuring Bobby Charlton, George Best and Denis Law – 5-0 after an initial away defeat of 1-4, which was instrumental in the ousting of his predecessor, the Brazilian Gentil Cardoso. After a tight contest in the semifinals against Olympique Lyonnais Sporting met MTK Budapest in the final. The match in Brussel's Heysel Stadium ended 3-3. The rematch in Antwerp was decided  by a directly converted corner kick by João Morais, who was replacing injured star defender Hilário Conceição, thus Sporting gained its hitherto only international trophy.

After this, Fernandez withdrew and made way for Frenchman Jean Luciano. Another crisis at the club made Fernandez step up once more for several weeks. He began the next season at the helm of the club. Fernandez, who up to then has offered all his services to Sporting for free, including his work for the stadium, was offered a remuneration of 15 million Escudos, which he considered low. Further dissonances led to an early separation. The Brazilian Otto Glória succeeded him and achieved the championship by the end of the year.

Fernandez continued coaching at the then first division club CUF Barreiro, which achieved mid-table positions between 1965/66 and 1967/68. In his third season with CUF  he got severely injured in a road accident requiring neurosurgery. This led to his retirement.

In further years the Sporting Clube de Portugal should bestow all its honours – the Prémio Stomp and honorary membership – to Anselmo Fernandez. Os Cinquentenários, an organisation closely linked to the club, anointed him Visconde de Alvalade, the  "Viscount of Alvalade".

Architectural Works 
 Estádio José Alvalade, Lisbon, 1956 (with António Augusto Sá da Costa)
 Hotel Tivoli, Lisbon, 1956 (with Porfírio Pardal Monteiro and António Pardal Monteiro)
 National Library of Portugal (with Porfírio Pardal Monteiro and António Pardal Monteiro)
 Reitoria da Universidade, Lisbon (with Porfírio Pardal Monteiro and António Pardal Monteiro). Awarded with the Prémio Valmor 
 Faculdade de Letras, Lisbon (with Porfírio Pardal Monteiro and António Pardal Monteiro)
 Faculdade de Direito, Lisbon (with Porfírio Pardal Monteiro and António Pardal Monteiro)
 Hotel Florida, Lisbon (with Jorge Ferreira Chaves e Eduardo Goulartt Medeiros).

See also
List of UEFA Cup Winners' Cup winning managers

External links
 Rodriguez, Anselmo Fernandez, 1918-2000 -- Arquitectura -- (Fotografias), Fundação Calouste Gulbenkian – Biblioteca de Arte, per 10/12/2012.
 Hotel Tivoli, Portugal, Lisboa, Lisboa, Coração de Jesus, Sistema dae Informação para o Património Arquitectónico, Instituto da Habitação e da Reabilitação Urbana, 2011.
 Hotel Ritz, Portugal, Lisboa, Lisboa, São Sebastião da Pedreira, Sistema dae Informação para o Património Arquitectónico, Instituto da Habitação e da Reabilitação Urbana, 2011.
 Anselmo Fernandez, Sporting Clube de Portugal,

1918 births
2000 deaths
Sportspeople from Lisbon
Portuguese football managers
Primeira Liga managers
Sporting CP managers
20th-century Portuguese architects